Toranj  was singer-songwriter Mohsen Namjoo's official debut in 2007, as none of his previous albums were allowed for legal release by Iranian governmental authorities. Also it was the last album of the artist to get legal license. The album featured nine traditional folk songs, including poems from Hafez, Rumi, Baba Taher and Attar.

Track listing
 "Toranj" – Poems by Hafez and Khaju
 "Ro Sar Beneh be Balin" – Poem by Molavi
 "Talkhi Nakonad" – Poem by Molawi
 "Vava Layli" – Poem by Baba Taher
 "Tarsam ke..." – Poem by Hafez
 "Del Miravad" – Poem by Hafez
 "Joreh Baz" – Poem by Baba Taher
 "dar Mian-e Jaan (Vang Vang)" – Poem by Attar
 "Zolf" – Poem by Hafez

References

2007 debut albums
Mohsen Namjoo albums